Blue & Lonesome is a compilation album by American country music artist George Jones released in 1964 on the Mercury Records label.

Background
Although Jones had left Mercury at the end of 1961 for United Artists, his old label continued releasing albums featuring sides by Jones from their archive, some of which dated back to his days recording on the independent Starday label.  Every track on this album had been previously released on an album or single.

As the title suggest, Blue & Lonesome includes songs that Jones built his reputation on: hardcore honky tonk songs with themes of heartache and loss.  Although it is a compilation, it is an impressive collection featuring a mixed bag of Jones originals and songs made famous by others, including Marty Robbins, Don Gibson, Lefty Frizzell and Hank Williams.  The Jones-penned "Don't Stop The Music" had been a minor hit for the singer in early 1957 while "Life To Go", also written by Jones, was a top five smash for Stonewall Jackson in 1959.  Blue & Lonesome also includes the original recording of "Color of the Blues", a song Jones wrote with Lawton Williams that would go on to be recorded by Red Sovine, Skeeter Davis, Loretta Lynn, Elvis Costello and Patty Loveless.

Blue & Lonesome was reissued by Righteous Records, a reissue imprint marketed and distributed by Great Britain's Cherry Red label with bonus tracks recorded earlier in Jones's career.

Reception
Thom Jurek of AllMusic calls Blue & Lonesome "an excellent portrait of Jones' transition. He was well on his way to becoming the great singer of broken love songs and honky tonk ballads from the rockabilly and hillbilly singer of his youth, and these tune prove it."

Track listing

Personnel
Grady Martin, Jerry Kennedy, Hank Garland, Harold Bradley – guitar
Buddy Emmons, Jimmy Day – steel guitar
Bob Moore – bass
Buddy Harman – drums
Tommy Jackson, Rufus Thibodeaux – fiddle
Floyd Cramer, Hargus "Pig" Robbins – piano

External links
 George Jones' Official Website

1964 albums
George Jones albums
Albums produced by Pappy Daily
Albums produced by Shelby Singleton
Mercury Records albums